The yellow-rumped seedeater, yellow-rumped serin or Abyssinian yellow-rumped seedeater (Crithagra xanthopygia) is a species of finch in the family Fringillidae.
It is found in Eritrea, Kenya and Ethiopia.
Its natural habitat is subtropical or tropical dry shrubland.

The yellow-rumped seedeater was formerly placed in the genus Serinus but phylogenetic analysis using mitochondrial and nuclear DNA sequences found that the genus was polyphyletic. The genus was therefore split and a number of species including the yellow-rumped seedeater were moved to the resurrected genus Crithagra.

References

yellow-rumped seedeater
Birds of the Horn of Africa
yellow-rumped seedeater
Taxonomy articles created by Polbot